Stowe or Stow is a small village and civil parish in south Shropshire, England.

The parish has a border with Wales and the Welsh town of Knighton is less than two miles to the southwest of the village; a very small part of the town (including Knighton station) actually lies within Stowe parish and Shropshire. The population of the civil ward at the 2011 census was 140.

Also nearby is the Salopian village of Bucknell and the Welsh hamlet of Milebrook.

The A488 and A4113 roads pass nearby.

Parish meeting
Instead of a parish council it has a parish meeting; this is due to the very small population of the parish. The parish is represented by an elected chairman, these have been 
 Mrs Peggy Pickup 1981 - 1991
 Mrs M L Blyghton 1991 - 1993
 Bill Parker 1993 - 1994
 Brenda Sadler 1994 - 2003
 Liz Trow 2003 - 2007
 Connor Birch 2007 - 2012
 Roger Casstles 2012 - 2016
 Colin Bentley 2016 -

See also
Listed buildings in Stowe, Shropshire

References

External links

Civil parishes in Shropshire
Villages in Shropshire